Ozognathus is a genus of death-watch and spider beetles in the family Ptinidae. There are at least three described species in Ozognathus.

Species
These three species belong to the genus Ozognathus:
 Ozognathus cornutus (LeConte, 1859)
 Ozognathus dubius Fall, 1905
 Ozognathus floridanus LeConte, 1878

References

Further reading

 
 
 

Bostrichoidea
Articles created by Qbugbot